Allein Gail Q. Maliksi (born September 18, 1987) is a Filipino professional basketball player for the Meralco Bolts of the Philippine Basketball Association (PBA). He was drafted 8th by the Petron Blaze Boosters in the 2011 PBA draft.

College career 
Maliksi played for the UST Growling Tigers. He was only able to play one full season in the UAAP.

PBA D-League career 
Maliksi played with the Cebuana Lhuillier Gems in the PBA D-League.  He became the D-League’s first-ever MVP in the 2011 Foundation Cup where he led the Gems to the finals before losing to the NLEX Road Warriors.

Professional career
On August 28, 2011, Maliksi was drafted eight overall in the 2011 PBA draft by the Petron Blaze Boosters, but was traded on draft day to the Barako Bull Energy.

On November 2011, just around three months after being drafted, Maliksi was traded by Barako Bull to Barangay Ginebra Kings in a three-team trade that also involved B-Meg Llamados.

On January 22, 2013, Maliksi was traded by Ginebra back to Barako Bull in a five-team, ten-player trade.

On August 16, 2013, the PBA approved a trade that sent him to the Star Hotshots in exchange of a 2017 second round pick, Wesley Gonzales and Chris Pacana. On September 27, 2013, in a do-or-die quarterfinals matchup against the Alaska Aces, he suffered a partial ACL tear that would sideline him for 6 months.

Following the departure to Rain or Shine Elasto Painters of Star's main man James Yap during the 2016–17 PBA season , Maliksi has been given more minutes under new coach Chito Victolero. On January 28, 2017, he led the Star with 25 points in a lop-sided 47-point win against Meralco Bolts, making him named as Player of The Week. Allein set his career-high 33 points the following game in a 124–87 victory against Mahindra, hitting 7-out-of-8 in the three-point line.

On September 10, 2017, Maliksi, along with Chris Javier, was traded to the Blackwater Elite for Kyle Pascual and Riego Gamalinda.

On October 25, 2019, Maliksi, along with Raymar Jose, was traded to the Meralco Bolts for Mike Tolomia, KG Canaleta, and two second round draft picks in 2020 and 2022.

Career statistics

UAAP 

|-
| align="left" | 2008-09
| align="left"; rowspan=2| UST
| 1 || 5 || .333 || 1.000 || — || — || — || 1.0 || — || 3.0
|-
| align="left" | 2009-10
| 12 || 14.3 || .341 || .333 || .800 || 4.3 || .5 || .3 || .2 || 14.3
|-class=sortbottom
| align="center" colspan=2 | Career
| 13 || 13.6 || .341 || .355 || .800 || 4.0 || .5 || .4 || .2 || 13.5

PBA Season-by-season averages
As of the end of 2021 season
|-
| align=left rowspan=2| 
| align=left | Barako Bull
| rowspan=2|19 || rowspan=2|13.8 || rowspan=2|.409 || rowspan=2|.333 || rowspan=2|.889 || rowspan=2|2.3 || rowspan=2|.1 || rowspan=2|.2 || rowspan=2|.2 || rowspan=2|6.5
|-
| align=left | Barangay Ginebra
|-
| align=left rowspan=3| 
| align=left | Barangay Ginebra
| rowspan=3|33 || rowspan=3|23.7 || rowspan=3|.386 || rowspan=3|.342 || rowspan=3|.817 || rowspan=3|3.2 || rowspan=3|1.0 || rowspan=3|.5 || rowspan=3|.1 || rowspan=3|9.0
|-
| align=left | Barako Bull
|-
| align=left | San Mig Coffee
|-
| align=left | 
| align=left | San Mig Super Coffee
| 19 || 12.2 || .429 || .344 || .857 || .9 || .4 || .4 || .1 || 5.1
|-
| align=left | 
| align=left | Purefoods / Star
| 37 || 13.6 || .418 || .382 || .750 || 2.0 || .6 || .1 || .2 || 6.1
|-
| align=left | 
| align=left | Star
| 33 || 18.9 || .441 || .444 || .719 || 2.7 || .5 || .5 || .2 || 9.9
|-
| align=left rowspan=2| 
| align=left | Star
| rowspan=2|46 || rowspan=2|22.4 || rowspan=2|.424 || rowspan=2|.367 || rowspan=2|.776 || rowspan=2|3.1 || rowspan=2|.9 || rowspan=2|.7 || rowspan=2|.2 || rowspan=2|13.0
|-
| align=left | Blackwater
|-
| align=left | 
| align=left | Blackwater
| 32 || 26.2 || .366 || .294 || .750 || 5.0 || 1.8 || .7 || .2 || 11.4
|-
| align=left rowspan=2| 
| align=left | Blackwater
| rowspan=2|47 || rowspan=2|22.6 || rowspan=2|.421 || rowspan=2|.321 || rowspan=2|.820 || rowspan=2|3.9 || rowspan=2|1.6 || rowspan=2|.7 || rowspan=2|.3 || rowspan=2|11.5
|-
| align=left | Meralco
|-
| align=left | 
| align=left | Meralco
| 18 || 20.3 || .411 || .411 || .784 || 3.3 || 1.2 || .6 || .2 || 11.7
|-
| align=left | 
| align=left | Meralco
| 42 || 23.2 || .440 || .410 || .825 || 3.3 || 1.0 || .5 || .2 || 12.3
|-class=sortbottom
| align=center colspan=2 | Career
| 326 || 20.5 || .415 || .368 || .792 || 3.1 || 1.0 || .5 || .2 || 10.1

References

1987 births
Living people
Barako Bull Energy players
Barangay Ginebra San Miguel players
Basketball players from Metro Manila
Blackwater Bossing players
Magnolia Hotshots players
People from Makati
Philippine Basketball Association All-Stars
Philippines men's national basketball team players
Filipino men's basketball players
Shooting guards
Small forwards
UST Growling Tigers basketball players
Meralco Bolts players
San Miguel Beermen draft picks